Divinolândia is a municipality in the state of São Paulo in Brazil. The population is 11,086 (2020 est.) in an area of 224 km². The elevation is 1,040 m.

References

Municipalities in São Paulo (state)